Kirstin Valdez Quade is an American writer.

Early life and education
Quade was born to a white father and a Hispanic mother in Albuquerque, New Mexico. Her father was a desert geologist and her family lived throughout the Southwestern United States, as well as in Australia. She attended Phillips Exeter Academy and earned her BA from Stanford University and her MFA from the University of Oregon. From 2009 to 2011 she was a Wallace Stegner Fellow in the Creative Writing Program at Stanford University, where she also taught as a Jones Lecturer. In 2014-15, she was the Delbanco Visiting Professor of Creative Writing at the University of Michigan. She is currently an assistant professor of creative writing at Princeton University.

Career
Quade's work has appeared in The New Yorker, Narrative Magazine, The Best American Short Stories, The O. Henry Prize Stories, and elsewhere. Her writing weaves together themes of family, race, class, and coming-of-age, and unfold in New Mexico landscapes inspired by the author's own upbringing.

Her debut short story collection, Night at the Fiestas, received critical praise and won awards. A review in The New York Times labeled her stories "legitimate masterpieces" and called the book a "haunting and beautiful debut story collection." The Five Wounds, her debut novel, was published in 2021. The novel was shortlisted for the 2022 Andrew Carnegie Medal for Excellence in Fiction.

Awards and honors
2013 Narrative Prize for "Nemecia."
2013 Rona Jaffe Foundation Writers' Award
2014 National Book Foundation "5 Under 35 Award" for Night at the Fiestas
2014 PEN/O. Henry Stories selection for "Nemecia."
2016 John Leonard Prize, winner for Night at the Fiestas
2021 Center for Fiction First Novel Prize for The Five Wounds

Bibliography

References

External links

 KirstinValdezQuade.com - Official Website
 Kirstin Valdez Quade's faculty profile at the Lewis Center for the Arts
 Best Advice on writing at Narrative Magazine
 Night at the Fiestas, a book review at The New York Times
 Interview with Kirstin Valdez Quade at NPR

Year of birth missing (living people)
Living people
21st-century American novelists
21st-century American short story writers
21st-century American women writers
American women academics
American women novelists
American women short story writers
Hispanic and Latino American novelists
Hispanic and Latino American short story writers
Phillips Exeter Academy alumni
Stanford University alumni
University of Oregon alumni
Stanford University faculty
University of Michigan faculty
Stegner Fellows
Writers from Albuquerque, New Mexico